Dénestanville is a commune in the Seine-Maritime department in the Normandy region in north-western France.

Geography

History
Danestanvilla 1051, Donestanville 1088, Dunestanvilla 1142. Dunstan's farm, name of an Anglo-Saxon farmer who came from danelaw with the danes, probably in the 10th century, to settle in Normandy.
Seat of the family de Dunstanville. See Reginald de Dunstanville.

Population

Places of interest
 A château.
 The church of St.Martin, dating from the twelfth century.

See also
Communes of the Seine-Maritime department

References

Communes of Seine-Maritime